The Women's 4 × 5 kilometre relay competition at the FIS Nordic World Ski Championships 2019 was held on 28 February 2019.

Results
The race was started at 13:00.

References

Women's 4 x 5 kilometre relay